Mónica Marie Gerardo Moran (born 10 November 1976) is an American-born Mexican football manager and former professional player who played as a midfielder and a forward. She has been capped by the Mexico women's national team, appearing at the 1999 FIFA Women's World Cup. At club level, she has played in the Women's United Soccer Association (WUSA) for the Washington Freedom.

Playing career

College
Gerardo played with Notre Dame Fighting Irish from 1995 until 1998. As a freshman Gerardo contributed to the team's 1995 NCAA Division I Women's Soccer Tournament win. She left as the program's all-time leader in goals and points, with 73 and 109, respectively.

Club
In 2000 Gerardo played for Women's Premier Soccer League (WPSL) team Ajax. She was drafted by Washington Freedom ahead of the inaugural 2001 season of the Women's United Soccer Association (WUSA). In the Freedom's first year, Gerardo scored two goals in 19 appearances (nine starts) as the team slumped to a joint-last placed finish. In 2002 the Freedom performed better. Gerardo posted three goals, starting 10 of her 19 appearances as the team finished the regular season in third place. She also scored a late game-winning goal in the play-off semi-final win over Philadelphia Charge, which qualified the team for Founders Cup II, where they were beaten 3–2 by Carolina Courage.

Early in the 2003 season Gerardo announced her sudden retirement from professional soccer, to accept a coaching position with the Pittsburgh Panthers.

International

A promising forward for the Notre Dame Fighting Irish in college soccer, Gerardo was one of several Californian-born players with Mexican eligibility to be called up by Mexico's coach Leonardo Cuéllar. After scoring five goals in qualifying, she played in all three games for Mexico at the 1999 FIFA Women's World Cup; defeats by Brazil, Germany and Italy. Gerardo totaled 15 goals in her 30 caps with Mexico.

After Futbol

Monica Gerardo is now the principal for St. Marks Lutheran School in Hacienda Heights, California and has held that position since 2019.

See also

 List of Mexico women's international footballers

References

External links

 Profile at Women's United Soccer Association
 Profile at Whittier College

1976 births
Living people
Citizens of Mexico through descent
Mexican women's footballers
Women's association football midfielders
Women's association football forwards
Mexico women's international footballers
1999 FIFA Women's World Cup players
Mexican football managers
Female association football managers
Women's association football managers
People from Simi Valley, California
Soccer players from California
American women's soccer players
Notre Dame Fighting Irish women's soccer players
Washington Freedom players
Women's United Soccer Association players
American women's soccer coaches
Whittier Poets women's soccer coaches
Navy Midshipmen women's soccer coaches
Pittsburgh Panthers women's soccer coaches
Saint Mary's Gaels women's soccer coaches
American sportspeople of Mexican descent
Ajax America Women players